Following is the list of cultural heritage sites in Lahore, Punjab, Pakistan.

Protected sites  

Following is the list of sites protected by the Federal Government of Pakistan.

|}

Special premises 

|}

Unprotected Sites

Walled City of Lahore  

|}

References 

Buildings and structures in Lahore
Archaeological sites in Pakistan
Cultural heritage sites in Punjab, Pakistan
Lahore-related lists
Culture in Lahore